Nickelodeon, often shortened to Nick is a Slovenian television channel. It is served by the pan-European feed. It launched on April 28, 2013, along with Nickelodeon (Serbia).

Programing Nick Jr.

Current
BabyRiki (2021–present)
Mofy (2022–present)
Pic Me
Poppets Town

Upcoming
Ni Hao, Kai Lan (2023)

Former 
Andy's Baby Animals
Andy's Safari Adventures
Annedroids
The Hive
Miffy's Adventures Big and Small
Dragon
Lego Friends
Maisy
Humf
Rusty Rivets
Jack
Tee and Mo
Ebb and Flo
Esme & Roy
Jane and the Dragon
Little People
Molang
Zig & Sharko
Dot.
Dorothy the Dinosaur
Eliot Kid
PAW Patrol
Nature Cat
PJ Masks
Sarah & Duck
The Choo Choo Bob Show
Ricky Zoom
Vitaminix
Dragon Tales
Zou
PopPixie
Pokémon
Peppa Pig
Splash and Bubbles
Top Wing
Sid the Science Kid
SamSam
Stella & Sam
StoryBots
StoryBots Super Songs
Tickety Toc
Roary the Racing Car
Chloe's Closet
Tipi Tales
Timothy Goes to School
Bob the Builder
Poppy Cat
Zafari
Zoofari
Barney & Friends (2013-2020)
Bear in the Big Blue House (2013-2014)
Ben & Holly's Little Kingdom (2013-2018)
Fireman Sam (2013-2016)
The Wiggles (2013-2016)
Doggy Day School (2013-2017)
Dino Dan (2013-2017)
Hey Duggee(2016-2020)
Igam Ogam (2013)
Julius Jr. (2016)
Julius and Friends (2016)
Peg's Project (2021-2022)
Julius's World (2016)
Justin Time(2013-2016)
Storytime With Justin (2013-2016)
Justin Time Go!(2018-2020)
Winx Club (2013-2016)
Super Wings(2015-2019)
Super Why (2013-2016)
Messy Goes to Okido (2015)
Corn & Peg (2021-2022)
Peg + Cat (2019-2023)
Peter Rabbit (2016-2020)
Dinopaws (2020)
Lola & Virginia (2021-2023)
Baby Jake (2013-2015)
Bubble Guppies (2013-2017)
Daniel Tiger (2013-2017)
44 Cats (2020)
64 Zoo Lane (2013-2022)
Abby Hatcher (2021-2022)
Babar (2013-2015)

References

Slovenia
Television channels and stations established in 2013
2013 establishments in Slovenia
Television channels in Slovenia